Parisu is a 1963 Indian Tamil-language film directed by D. Yoganand. The film stars M. G. Ramachandran, Savitri and M. R. Radha. It was released on 15 November 1963, Diwali day.

Plot 

To infiltrate for the needs for his investigation, Venu, an elite policeman, sees his love life being upset. He has to give up to the only woman for him, Ponni, an innocent provincial, to take the hand of the most attractive, Shanti, younger sister of Viswam, an enigmatic notable. It is under this condition that Viswam accepts him to marry Mala, younger sister of Raghu, Venu's childhood friend, who was assaulted lethally instead of the policeman. Venu swore then to his dying friend to stay up her sister, who is in love with Viswam. Because of the promise made to Raghu and the horrible blackmail exercised by Viswam, Venu resigns. This is a situation which is not to displease all, it suits perfectly to Rangadurai, a good-for-nothing and kin of Ponni, since he has desired her for a long time! Venu is not at the end of his surprises, many new developments still await him.

Cast 
 M. G. Ramachandran as Venu
 Savitri as Ponni
 M. R. Radha as Rangadurai
 M. N. Nambiar as Viswam
 Nagesh as Jimmy
 Ragini as Shanti
 Rajasulochana as Mala
 M. K. Mustapha as Raghu
 S. M. Thirupathisamy as Ramaiya

Production 
Parisu is the maiden venture of Gowri Pictures, and was initially titled Kathal Parisu.

Soundtrack 
The music was composed by K. V. Mahadevan, with lyrics by Kannadasan.

Release and reception 
Parisu was released on 15 November 1963, Diwali day. Writing for Sport and Pastime, T. M. Ramachandran said, "The story is inconsequential. At best, it is used as a peg to hang the various songs, oft-repeated romantic and comic interludes and fighting sequences". Kanthan of Kalki criticised the story for lack of originality.

References

External links 
 

1960s Tamil-language films
1963 films
Films directed by D. Yoganand
Films scored by K. V. Mahadevan